Marega Salaa is a 2009 Bollywood Hindi film directed by Devang Dholakia and produced by Hema Handa.

Cast
 Jimmy Shergill
 Kim Sharma 
 Hrishitaa Bhatt
 Rajit Kapur
 Kabir Sadanand
 Mahek Chahal
 Farid Amiri
 Rakhi Sawant as an item number "Sehra Sehra Tujhpe Dil"

Release
This film was released in India on 20 November 2009 to mixed reviews.

References

External links
 

2009 films
2010s Hindi-language films
Films set in Mumbai
2000s Hindi-language films